Sütlüce is a village in the Adaklı District, Bingöl Province, Turkey. The village is populated by Kurds of the Hormek tribe and had a population of 110 in 2021.

The hamlets of Ağaköy, Akkuş, Çatkuyu, Çavuşlar, Gümüşpınar, Güneyce, Güvercin, Karabudak, Kavak, Komçayırı and Şaban are attached to the village.

References 

Villages in Adaklı District
Kurdish settlements in Bingöl Province